Elapomorphus is a genus of venomous snakes of the family Colubridae.
The genus is endemic to Brazil.

Species
The genus Elapomorphus contains two species. - 
 Elapomorphus quinquelineatus  - Raddi's lizard-eating snake
 Elapomorphus wuchereri  - Wucherer's lizard-eating snake

Nota bene: A binomial authority in parentheses indicates that the species was originally described in a genus other than Elapomorphus.

Etymology
The specific name, wuchereri, is in honor of Portuguese-born German-Brazilian herpetologist Otto Edward Henry Wucherer.

References

Further reading
Günther A (1861). "Account of the Reptiles sent by Dr. Wucherer from Bahia". Ann. Mag. Nat. Hist., Third Series 7: 412–417. ("Elapomorphus Wuchereri ", new species, pp. 415–416).
Raddi G (1820). "Di alcune specie nuove di rettili, e piante brasiliane ". Memorie di Matematica e di Fisica della Società Italiana residente in Modena 18: 313–349. ("Coluber 5-lineatus ", new species, pp. 339–340). (in Italian and Latin).
Wiegmann [AFA] in Fitzinger L (1843). Systema Reptilium, Fasciculus Primus, Amblyglossae. Vienna: Braumüller & Seidel. 106 pp. + indices. ("Elapomorphus Wiegm.", new genus, p. 25). (in Latin).

Elapomorphus
Taxa named by Arend Friedrich August Wiegmann
Snake genera